Tepava Ridge (‘Hrebet Tepava’ \'hre-bet te-'pa-va\) is the narrow rocky ridge extending 7.55 km towards Sandilh Point to the east, 1.6 km wide, and rising to 653 m at its west wxtremity in eastern Aristotle Mountains on Oscar II Coast in Graham Land.  It surmounts to the north and south the branches of Pequod Glacier flowing into Exasperation Inlet and Durostorum Bay respectively.  The feature is named after the settlement of Tepava in Northern Bulgaria.

Location
British mapping in 1976.

Maps
 British Antarctic Territory.  Scale 1:200000 topographic map.  DOS 610 Series, Sheet W 65 62.  Directorate of Overseas Surveys, Tolworth, UK, 1976.
 Antarctic Digital Database (ADD). Scale 1:250000 topographic map of Antarctica. Scientific Committee on Antarctic Research (SCAR). Since 1993, regularly upgraded and updated.

Notes

References
 Tepava Ridge. SCAR Composite Antarctic Gazetteer.
 Bulgarian Antarctic Gazetteer. Antarctic Place-names Commission. (details in Bulgarian, basic data in English)

External links
 Tepava Ridge. Copernix satellite image

Ridges of Graham Land
Oscar II Coast
Bulgaria and the Antarctic